The 2009 Challenger ATP Iquique was a professional tennis tournament played on outdoor clay courts. It was part off the 2009 ATP Challenger Tour. It took place in Iquique, Chile between 19 and 25 January 2009.

Singles main-draw entrants

Seeds

 Rankings are as of January 12, 2009.

Other entrants
The following players received wildcards into the singles main draw:
  Adrián García
  Gastón Gaudio
  Victor Morales
  Mariano Zabaleta

The following players received entry from the qualifying draw:
  Jorge Aguilar
  Enrico Burzi
  Guillermo Hormazábal
  Grzegorz Panfil

Champions

Singles

 Máximo González def.  Guillermo Hormazábal, 6–4, 6–4

Doubles

 Johan Brunström /  Jean-Julien Rojer def.  Pablo Cuevas /  Horacio Zeballos, 6–3, 6–4

Challenger ATP Iquique